Bangladesh Garment Manufacturers and Exporters Association or BGMEA is a nationwide trade organization of garments manufacturers in Bangladesh and is located in the capital city of Dhaka. It plays a pivotal role in the country's earning sector of foreign trades.

History
BGMEA was founded in 1983. BGMEA University of Fashion and Technology is owned by the trade body. The trade body has a research wing.

BGMEA Bhaban

BGMEA Bhaban (BGMEA Building) is a 16-storey building that is the headquarters of BGMEA and is located in Hatirjheel, Dhaka. The foundation of the building was placed in 1998 by then Prime Minister Sheikh Hasina. In 2006 it was inaugurated by then Prime Minister Khaleda Zia. The building was built illegally on canal land.

On 3 April 2011 Bangladesh High Court ordered the building to be demolished. The court in its verdict declared:

A four-member bench of the Appellate Division of the Supreme Court of Bangladesh led by chief justice Surendra Kumar Sinha upheld the verdict of the High Court on 2 June 2016.

References

1983 establishments in Bangladesh
Foreign trade of Bangladesh
Organisations based in Dhaka
Trade associations based in Bangladesh
Manufacturing in Bangladesh